Modern Studies is a chamber pop band based between Scotland and Lancashire. The group has released four studio albums and a remix collaboration, all on Fire Records.

History
The band was founded in 2015 by Emily Scott, who had been writing songs on an antique harmonium in her home in Glasgow. She arranged to give the instrument to a friend, Pete Harvey, who owned a recording studio called Pumpkinfield in Perthshire, and together they began working on Scott's material with drummer Joe Smillie and multi-instrumentalist Rob St. John. Their debut studio album, Swell to Great, was issued by Song, by Toad Records in 2016 and then reissued worldwide by Fire Records in October 2017. The album was named in Mojo magazine's Top 20 albums of the year list, and on the long-list for the Scottish Album of the Year Award.

A follow-up, Welcome Strangers, was released in 2018, and this album was remixed in collaboration with Tommy Perman and issued as Emergent Slow Arcs in 2019. In May 2020, Modern Studies released their third studio album, The Weight of the Sun. The band have toured extensively across the UK, playing Glastonbury Festival and Celtic Connections festivals amongst others, and staged their own orchestral audio-visual show, ‘SOUNDING’ at the 2017 Edinburgh Festival Fringe.

Band members
 Emily Scott – vocals, organ, piano, double bass
 Rob St. John – vocals, guitar, synthesizer, harmonium, tape loops
 Pete Harvey – cello, bass guitar, piano
 Joe Smillie – drums, mellotron, vocals

Discography
Swell to Great (Fire, 2016)
Welcome Strangers (Fire, 2018)
Emergent Slow Arcs with Tommy Perman (Fire, 2019)
The Weight of the Sun (Fire, 2020)
We Are There (Fire, 2022)

References

External links
 
 

2015 establishments in England
Scottish rock music groups
Musical groups established in 2015